Pestagan (also Romanized as Pestagān; also known as Pestakān) is a village in Jafarabad Rural District, Jafarabad District, Qom County, Qom Province, Iran. At the 2006 census, its population was 714, in 134 families.

References 

Populated places in Qom Province